Portuguese Vacation (French: Vacances portugaises) is a 1963 French-Portuguese drama film directed by Pierre Kast and starring Françoise Arnoul, Michel Auclair and Jean-Pierre Aumont.

Cast
 Françoise Arnoul as Mathilde  
 Michel Auclair as Michel  
 Jean-Pierre Aumont as Jean-Pierre  
 Jean-Marc Bory as Jean-Marc  
 Françoise Brion as Eléonore  
 Catherine Deneuve as Catherine  
 Jacques Doniol-Valcroze as Jacques  
 Daniel Gélin as Daniel  
 Michèle Girardon as Geneviève  
 Barbara Laage as Barbara 
 Françoise Prévost as Françoise  
 Pierre Vaneck as Pierre  
 Bernhard Wicki as Bernard 
 Clara D'Ovar 
 Roger Hanin 
 Édouard Molinaro

References

Bibliography 
 Dayna Oscherwitz & MaryEllen Higgins. The A to Z of French Cinema. Scarecrow Press, 2009.

External links 
 

1963 films
1963 drama films
Portuguese drama films
French drama films
1960s French-language films
Films directed by Pierre Kast
Films set in Portugal
1960s French films